"Last Dance" is a song recorded by Greek-Dutch singer Stefania, digitally released on 10 March 2021. It was written by Dimitris Kontopoulos, songwriting team Arcade and Sharon Vaughn. The song represented Greece in the Eurovision Song Contest 2021.

Background and composition
On 18 March 2020, the day of the 2020 contest's cancellation, ERT was one of the first four broadcasters (the others being the Netherlands' AVROTROS, Spain's RTVE and Ukraine's UA:PBC) to confirm their participation in the next edition and to announce their continued cooperation with their 2020 artist, Stefania. "Last Dance" was written by Dimitris Kontopoulos, songwriting team Arcade, consisting of Anastasios Rammos, Diveno, Gavriil Gavrilidis, Pavlos Manolis, Egion Parreniasi and Loukas Damianakos. and Sharon Vaughn. On 7 January 2021, "Last Dance" was announced as the title of selected song, with its release planned for 10 March. On March 10, 2021, the official video clip premiered through ERT's hybrid platform ERTFLIX, and later was released on YouTube and the streaming media platforms.

Music video
The music video was filmed in Athens in February 2021 and was released at the same time as the premiere of the song, on 10 March 2020. Konstantinos Karydas, who was directed the official music video of "Supergirl", was chosen again to direct this year's video. He revealed information about the style of the video clip, which will be shot in studios and outdoors, aesthetics from paintings, dream images and many effects. Also, he said that the video clip tells a fantastic and dreamy story, which presses on the song's message that everything in life is transient and that each end brings a new beginning.

The official music video premiered on March 10, 2021, at 17:00 EET through ERTFLIX, ERT's hybrid platform and through Stefania's official channel on YouTube at 22:00 EET. "Using elements from Greek mythology, such as Pegasus and Atlas, given in a dreamy, but at the same time modern way", the central message of the song is highlighted, which is the phrase "Every end is always a new beginning".

Eurovision Song Contest

Internal selection
On March 18, 2020, the Hellenic Broadcasting Corporation (ERT) announced Greek-Dutch singer Stefania as the Greek representative for the Eurovision Song Contest 2021. On March 10, 2021, the song "Last Dance" was officially released.

In Rotterdam
The Eurovision Song Contest 2021 took place at Rotterdam Ahoy in Rotterdam, the Netherlands, and consisted of two semi-finals held on 18 and 20 May, and the grand final on 22 May 2021. The European Broadcasting Union (EBU) split up the competing countries into six different pots based on voting patterns from previous contests, with countries with favourable voting histories put into the same pot. For the 2021 contest, the semi-final allocation draw held for 2020, which was held on 28 January 2020, was used. Greece was placed into the second semi-final, which was held on 20 May 2021, and performed in the first half of the show. After placing fifth in the semi-final, the song advanced to the Grand Final where it finished joint tenth with 170 points.

Fokas Evangelinos was announced as the artistic director for the entry, responsible for the country's stage performance. Stefania was joined on stage by four dancers: George Papadopoulos (stage director for the Greek entry at the 2014 Contest), Nikos Koukakis, Markos Giakoumoglou and Costas Pavlopoulos.

Credits and personnel
Credits adapted from YouTube.
Locations
Recorded at Vox Studios (Athens, Greece)
Mixed at Cinelab Studios (Moscow, Russia) 
Mastered at Studio DMI (Las Vegas, Nevada, USA)

Personnel
Lead vocals – Stefania
Songwriting – Dimitris Kontopoulos, Arcade, Sharon Vaughn
Production – Dimitris Kontopoulos, Arcade Music
Mixing – Andrei Konoplev
Mastering – Luca Pretolesi
Recording – Aris Binis

Charts

Release history

Notes

References

2021 singles
2021 songs
English-language Greek songs
Eurovision songs of 2021
Eurovision songs of Greece
Songs written by Dimitris Kontopoulos
Songs written by Sharon Vaughn
Stefania Liberakakis songs
Synthwave songs